The Jackson Twins (begun November 27, 1950, ended March 24, 1979) was an American comic strip, created by Dick Brooks and distributed by the McNaught Syndicate. Warren Sattler was also a contributing artist for many years to The Jackson Twins.

Concept
The strip was centered on two identical-twin high school teenage girls, Jill and Jan Jackson, and their lives and social adventures in fictional Gardentown. The twins were all-American girl types of that era, trim and pretty, tight with the popular crowd and paired with their (usually) regular boyfriends Wiffie and Nightowl.  Their understanding parents were Jim and Julia, while their annoying younger brother Junior was frequently a target.  When bored with their social mastery, the twins would sometimes swap identities for a while, just to confuse everyone.

Into this halcyonic-to-be vision of American high school came various incarnations of the "A stranger rode into town" motif.  But after a bit of plot arc, all was always restored to the status quo.

The strip hit its peak in the mid-1960s, after which it lost readers from seeming lack of social relevance in more turbulent times and lost newspapers from attempts to remedy the first.  Notable however was one of the first comic strip or otherwise manifestations of a stalker, in the form of a social misfit type who adored one of the twins from a perpetual distance, only to hire someone to attack the twins just so he could stage a rescue.  The plan didn't work and the Jackson returned to her world and he to his.

Sources

External links 
 Toonopedia entry

American comic strips
1950 comics debuts
1979 comics endings
Comics characters introduced in 1950
Fictional twins
Female characters in comics
Child characters in comics
Comics about women
Drama comics